The Sad Variety is a 1964 thriller novel written by the Anglo-Irish writer Cecil Day-Lewis, written under the pen name of Nicholas Blake. It is the fifteenth and penultimate entry into the series featuring the private detective Nigel Strangeways. It marked a move away from the murder mysterys of the earlier novels into the then-fashionable spy novel genre.

Synopsis
Strangeways is called in by the Security Service to protect a professor, whose recent discovery makes him a target for Soviet intelligence, and his daughter. The action takes place in a country hotel in wintery Dorset.

References

Bibliography
 Stanford, Peter. C Day-Lewis: A Life. A&C Black, 2007.

1964 British novels
Novels by Cecil Day-Lewis
British thriller novels
British spy novels
British detective novels
Novels set in Dorset
Novels set in London
Collins Crime Club books